The women's 1500 metres race of the 2014–15 ISU Speed Skating World Cup 2, arranged in the Taereung International Ice Rink, in Seoul, South Korea, was held on 22 November 2014.

The race was won by Marrit Leenstra of the Netherlands, while Ireen Wüst of the Netherlands in second place, and Olga Graf of Russia in third place. Noh Seon-yeong of South Korea won Division B.

Results
The race took place on Saturday, 22 November, with Division B scheduled in the morning session, at 11:52, and Division A scheduled in the afternoon session, at 17:08.

Division A

Division B

References

Women 1500
2
ISU